The Besa Movement is a centre-right ethnic Albanian political party in North Macedonia. It was formed in November 2014 by Bilall Kasami, Arjanit Hoxha and Adnan Azizi.

References

External links
Official web site

Political parties established in 2014
Albanian political parties in North Macedonia
Political parties of minorities
2014 establishments in the Republic of Macedonia
Social conservative parties